The 2006 National Lacrosse League season was the 20th season in the history of the league, which began as the Eagle Pro Box Lacrosse League in 1987. The season began on December 30, 2005 and concluded with the championship game on May 13, 2006.

The defending champion Toronto Rock were once again the favourite to win the Champions' Cup, but a slow start plus a dismal performance in the semifinal game against Rochester removed the Rock from contention. The Colorado Mammoth, under first-year head coach Gary Gait, won their first title since winning the first ever title in 1987, as the Baltimore Thunder.

Highly touted Portland rookie Brodie Merrill lived up to his hype, winning both the Defensive Player of the Year and the Rookie of the Year awards. Portland continued its domination of the post-season awards with Derek Keenan, himself a former Rookie of the Year Award winner (1992 with Buffalo), winning both the Les Bartley Award for coach of the year and the GM of the Year Award, and owner Angela Batinovich winning the Executive of the Year Award.

Team movement

The season featured the debut of two expansion teams; the Edmonton Rush and the Portland LumberJax, both in the Western Division. Portland beat the expansion team odds and won its division, finishing with an 11–5 record, while Edmonton did not fare so well. The Rush finished the season 1–15, their only win coming at the hands of their provincial rivals, the Calgary Roughnecks.

Before the 2006 season, the Anaheim Storm folded not being able to attract enough fans in their two years in Southern California moving from their original home of New Jersey after the 2003 season where, for two seasons, they were not able to attract enough fans.

Milestones
February 18: John Tavares tied Gary Gait for the all-time record in points, with 1091, as the Buffalo Bandits defeated the Minnesota Swarm 14–9.
March 4: Tavares sets a new NLL record for career points, scoring his 1092nd point in an 11–8 loss to the Swarm.

Final standings

Regular season

Toronto won the 3-way tiebreaker with Minnesota and Philadelphia

Playoffs

All-Star game
The 2006 All-Star Game was held at the Air Canada Centre in Toronto, Ontario on February 25, 2006. The West Division defeated the East Division 14–13. The MVP of the game was Lewis Ratcliff of the Calgary Roughnecks, who scored 4 goals, including the game winner. This marked the second straight year that a Roughneck player was All-Star Game MVP, with Tracy Kelusky having won it in 2005.

All-Star teams

Awards

Annual

All-Pro Teams
First Team
Colin Doyle, Toronto
John Grant, Jr., Rochester
Brodie Merrill, Portland
Gavin Prout, Colorado 
Josh Sanderson, Toronto 
Steve Dietrich, Buffalo

Second Team
Craig Conn, Arizona 
Dan Dawson, Arizona 
Jay Jalbert, Colorado 
Lewis Ratcliff, Calgary 
John Tavares, Buffalo 
Nick Patterson, Minnesota

All-Rookie Team
 Brodie Merrill, Portland 
 Sean Greenhalgh, Philadelphia 
 Dan Carey, Colorado 
 Jeff Zywicki, San Jose 
 Shawn Evans, Rochester 
 Luke Wiles, San Jose

Weekly awards
The NLL gives out awards weekly for the best overall player, best offensive player, best defensive player, and best rookie.

Monthly awards
Awards are also given out monthly for the best overall player and best rookie.

Statistics leaders
Bold numbers indicate new single-season records. Italics indicate tied single-season records.

See also
2006 in sports

References

External links
Standings from pointstreak.com
Scoring Leaders from pointstreak.com
Goalie Leaders from pointstreak.com

06
National Lacrosse League